Mobile is a British television drama series, broadcast over three episodes, each featuring part of an interweaving plot involving a fictional mobile phone operator and the adverse-effect of mobile phone radiation to health. The series was first broadcast on 19 March 2007 on ITV. The series starred a number of well known actors, including Jamie Draven, Neil Fitzmaurice, Keith Allen, Sunetra Sarker, Samantha Bond, Brittany Ashworth and Julie Graham. The three-part series was written and created by John Fay. The series was released on DVD on 9 April 2007, with a running time of 207 minutes. The US broadcast and release of the series, via Acorn Media, separates the series into four episodes of 50 minutes each, with the additional fourth episode being entitled "The Showdown".

Plot
The series is set in Liverpool and Manchester, and the main action takes place in the present day, with a backstory of events surrounding the 2003 Iraq War. Alongside Liverpool and Manchester, the series was filmed in Wirksworth, Derbyshire, on the Ecclesbourne Valley Railway. Each of the three episodes focuses on a different individual caught up in the overall story. In episode one, Neil Fitzmaurice stars as Eddie Doig, a man diagnosed with an inoperable brain tumour. Blaming the long-term use of his mobile phone for his condition, he is persuaded by a hypnotist to mount a terror campaign against masts belonging to a fictitious mobile phone company. In episode two, Iraq War veteran and armed response officer Maurice Stoan (Jamie Draven) is also revealed as part of the campaign. A trained marksman, he shoots people using mobile phones, causing fear and panic among the public. In the last episode, James Corson (Keith Allen), who is having a relationship with Collette West (Brittany Ashworth), the CEO of the phone company, is kidnapped by Stoan, whose intention is to assassinate Corson. However, the series ends with a terrifying twist as the truth about those behind the terror campaign is revealed.

Cast
 Neil Fitzmaurice as Eddie Doig
 Keith Allen as Sir James Corson
 Sunetra Sarker as DI Lorraine Conil
 Shaun Dooley as DI George Fleming
 Russell Boulter as DS John Goddard
 Phil Rowson as DS Charlie Lathom
 Michael J. Jackson as Supt Hewitt
 Jamie Draven as Maurice Stoan
 Brittany Ashworth as Collette West
 Frank Lauder as Bobby Dean
 Julie Graham as Donna Doig
 Warren Brown as Tommo Nobbs
 John Thomson as Ray Bould
 John McArdle as Paul Stoan
 Michael Kitchen as David West
 Samantha Bond as Rachel West

Episodes

References

External links
 

2000s British drama television series
2007 British television series debuts
2007 British television series endings
Television series by ITV Studios
Television shows produced by Granada Television
English-language television shows
Iraq War in television
ITV television dramas
2000s British television miniseries
Television shows set in Liverpool
Television shows set in Manchester